Jerry Allen Mansfield  (August 13, 1892 – October 27, 1960) was an American football fullback who played two seasons with the Rock Island Independents of the American Professional Football Association. He attended Rock Island High School in Rock Island, Illinois. He died on the 27th of October, 1960, aged 68.

External links
Just Sports Stats
Fanbase profile
rockislandindependents.com

1892 births
1960 deaths
Players of American football from Illinois
American football fullbacks
Rock Island Independents players
Sportspeople from Rock Island, Illinois